The administrative divisions of Haiti are concerned with the institutional and territorial organization of Haitian territory. There are many administrative divisions which may have political (local government), electoral (districts), or administrative (decentralized services of the state) objectives.

Administrative divisions 
, Haiti is divided into the following:
 4 regions being North, Centre, West, and South.
 10 departments with the possibility to go up to 16.
 The departments are subdivided into 42 arrondissements.
 The arrondissements are subdivided into 144 communes.
 The communes are subdivided into 65 quarters.
 The quarters are subdivided into 571 communal sections.

Geographically, the departments are the largest territorial divisions, regrouping into arrondissements (districts) and communes (municipalities). The Arrondissement, encompasses a number of communes. While the Commune is composed of the city, neighborhoods and communal sections are basic territorial subdivisions. Quarters are neighborhoods whose status remain vague, and an ill-defined territory.

References 

 
Haiti